The Australian Heritage Places Inventory (AHPI) was an online database of information about Australian places listed in State, Territory and Commonwealth Heritage Registers. The database was supported by the Heritage, Reef and Marine Division of the Department of Agriculture, Water and the Environment, which withdrew support of the database in 2020, and the database was taken down.

Contributing heritage registers
 ACT Heritage Register
 Western Australian Register of Heritage Places
 Northern Territory Heritage Register (NT) 
 New South Wales State Heritage Register
 Queensland Heritage Register
 Register of the National Estate
 South Australian Heritage Register
 Tasmanian Heritage Register
 Victorian Heritage Register

See also
Australian Heritage Database

References

Nature conservation in Australia
Heritage registers in Australia